Something Else Again is the second studio album by American folk singer and guitarist Richie Havens, released in January 1968. The track "Run, Shaker Life" was based on a Shaker dance song by elder Issachar Bates and reworked from Havens' old band, The Last Men, who reunited for this recording. "No Opportunity Necessary, No Experience Needed" was later reworked by Yes on its second album, Time and a Word.

Track listing 
 "No Opportunity Necessary, No Experience Needed" (Richie Havens) – 2:58
 "Inside of Him" (Havens) – 4:26
 "The Klan" ("Alan Grey, David Grey," pseudonyms for Alan Arkin and David Arkin) – 4:31
 "Sugarplums" – 2:54
 "Don't Listen to Me" (Havens) – 4:27
 "From the Prison" (Jerry Merrick) – 3:37
 "Maggie's Farm" (Bob Dylan) – 4:38
 "Something Else Again" – 7:30
 "New City" (Havens, John Court) – 2:47
 "Run, Shaker Life" (Havens, Joe Price, Mark Roth) – 5:46

Personnel
 Richie Havens – vocals, guitar, sitar, tamboura
Warren Bernhardt – organ, piano, clavinet
Denny Gerrard – bass on "Run, Shaker Life"
Don Payne – bass
Adrian Guillery – guitar
Paul "Dino" Williams – guitar, chant on "Run, Shaker Life"
Daniel Ben Zebulon – conga, drums, chant on "Run, Shaker Life"
Eddie Gómez – double bass
Donald MacDonald – drums
Skip Prokop – drums on "Run, Shaker Life"
Jeremy Steig – flute
John Blair – violin on "Inside of Him"
Technical
Val Valentin – director of engineering
Jerry Schoenbaum – production supervision

Charts

References 

1968 albums
Richie Havens albums
Verve Records albums